Deutsche Schule Las Palmas de Gran Canaria (DSLPA) is a German international school in Las Palmas, Canary Islands, Spain.

It serves preschool (vorschule), primary school (grundschule), and secondary school (sekundaria) levels 5–12.

It was founded in 1920.

References

External links
 Deutsche Schule Las Palmas

German international schools in Spain

1920 establishments in Spain

Schools in Las Palmas
International schools in the Canary Islands
Educational institutions established in 1920